Abecarnil (ZK-112,119) is an anxiolytic drug from the β-Carboline family. It is one of a relatively recently developed class of medicines known as the nonbenzodiazepines, which have similar effects to the older benzodiazepine group, but with quite different chemical structures. It is a partial agonist acting selectively at the benzodiazepine site of the GABAA receptor.

Abecarnil was originally developed as an anti-anxiety drug, but has not as yet been commercially developed for use in humans, instead so far mainly being used for research into the development of other new sedative and anxiolytic drugs. Investigations are continuing into its actions and it looks likely to be developed for use both in the treatment of anxiety, and as a less addictive substitute drug for the treatment of benzodiazepine and alcohol addiction. Abecarnil may also have fewer problems of tolerance and withdrawal problems compared to nonselective full agonist benzodiazepine acting drugs.

Abecarnil is a relatively subtype-selective drug which produces primarily anxiolytic effects, with comparatively less sedative or muscle relaxant properties, and does not significantly potentiate the effects of alcohol.

The abuse potential of abecarnil is thought to be less than that of benzodiazepines, with only mild withdrawal symptoms noted after abrupt discontinuation of treatment.

See also
Benzodiazepine
Nonbenzodiazepine

References 

Anxiolytics
Beta-Carbolines
Indole ethers at the benzene ring
Carboxylate esters
GABAA receptor positive allosteric modulators
Isopropyl esters